Alexander Nevsky is a 1938 Soviet historical drama film directed by Sergei Eisenstein. It depicts the attempted invasion of Novgorod in the 13th century by the Teutonic Knights of the Holy Roman Empire and their defeat by Prince Alexander, known popularly as Alexander Nevsky (1220–1263).

Eisenstein made the film in association with Dmitri Vasilyev and with a script co-written with Pyotr Pavlenko; they were assigned to ensure that Eisenstein did not stray into "formalism" and to facilitate shooting on a reasonable timetable. It was produced by Goskino via the Mosfilm production unit, with Nikolai Cherkasov in the title role and a musical score by Sergei Prokofiev. Alexander Nevsky was the first and most popular of Eisenstein's three sound films. Eisenstein, Pavlenko, Cherkasov and Abrikosov were awarded the Stalin Prize in 1941 for the film.

In 1978, the film was included in the world's 100 best motion pictures according to an opinion poll conducted by the Italian publishing house Arnoldo Mondadori Editore.

Russia Beyond considers the film one of the 10 best Russian war films.

Plot

The Teutonic Knights invade and conquer the city of Pskov with the help of the traitor Tverdilo and massacre its population. In the face of resistance by the boyars and merchants of Novgorod (urged on by the monk Ananias), Nevsky rallies the common people of Novgorod and in a decisive Battle of the Ice, on the surface of the frozen Lake Chudskoe, they defeat the Teutonic knights. The story ends in the retaken Pskov, where the ordinary foot-soldiers are set free, the surviving Teutonic knights will be held for ransom, and Tverdilo is swarmed over by the vengeful people (and supposedly torn to pieces).

A subplot throughout the film concerns Vasili Buslai and Gavrilo Oleksich, two famous warriors from Novgorod and friends, who become commanders of the Novgorod forces and who engage in a contest of courage and fighting skill throughout the Battle on the Ice in order to decide which of them will win the hand of Olga Danilovna, a Novgorod maiden whom both of them are courting. Vasilisa, the daughter of a boyar of Pskov killed by the Germans, joins the Novgorod forces as a front-line soldier, and she and Vasili fight side by side (which makes a strong impression on Vasili); she also personally slays the traitor Ananias. After both Gavrilo and Vasili have been seriously wounded, Vasili publicly states that neither he nor Gavrilo was the bravest in battle: that honor goes to Vasilisa, and that after her came Gavrilo. Thus, Gavrilo and Olga are united, while Vasili chooses Vasilisa as his bride-to-be (with her unspoken consent).

Cast
Nikolay Cherkasov as Prince Alexander Nevsky
 Nikolay Okhlopkov as Vasili Buslaev
 Andrei Abrikosov as Gavrilo Oleksich
 Dmitry Orlov as Ignat, the master armorer
 Vasili Novikov as Pavsha, a voivode of Pskov
 Nikolai Arsky as Domash Tverdislavich, a Novgorod boyar
 Varvara Massalitinova as Amelfa Timoferevna, Buslay's Mother
 Valentina Ivashova as Olga Danilovna, a maid of Novgorod
 Aleksandra Danilova as Vasilisa, a maid of Pskov
 Vladimir Yershov as Hermann von Balk, the Grand Master of the Teutonic Order
 Sergei Blinnikov as Tverdilo, the traitor of Pskov
 Ivan Lagutin as Anani, a Monk
 Lev Fenin as the Archbishop
 Naum Rogozhin as the Black-Hooded Monk

1930s political context

Eisenstein made Alexander Nevsky, his first completed film in 10 years, during the Stalinist era, at a time of strained relations between the Soviet Union and Nazi Germany. The film contains elements of obvious allegory that reflect the political situation between the two countries at the time of production. Some types of helmets worn by the Teutonic infantry resemble mock-ups of Stahlhelms from World War I. In the first draft of the Alexander Nevsky script, swastikas even appeared on the invaders' helmets. The film portrays Alexander as a folk hero and shows him bypassing a fight with the Mongols, his old foes, in order to face the more dangerous enemy.

The film also conveys highly anti-clerical and anti-Catholic messages. The knights' bishop's miter is adorned with swastikas, while religion plays a minor role on the Russian side, being present mostly as a backdrop in the form of Novgorod's St. Nicholas Cathedral and the clerics with their icons during the victorious entry of Nevsky into the city after the battle.

The film stemmed from a literary scenario entitled Rus, written by Pyotr Pavlenko, a Soviet novelist who conformed to socialist realist orthodoxy. The authorities could rely on Pavlenko, in his role of "consultant", to report any wayward tendencies on Eisenstein's part.

Alexander Nevsky stresses as a central theme the importance of the common people in saving Russia, while portraying the nobles and merchants as "bourgeoisie" and enemies of the people who do nothing, a motif that was heavily employed.

While shooting the film, Eisenstein published an article in the official newspaper of record Izvestia entitled "Alexander Nevsky and the Rout of the Germans". He drew a specific parallel between Nevsky and Stalin. As a result, the Kremlin requested an advance screening and, without Eisenstein being consulted, his assistants showed the footage to the General Secretary. During the process of this screening, one of the reels, which featured a scene depicting a brawl among the populace of Novgorod, disappeared. Whether it was left behind in the editing room inadvertently or whether Stalin saw the footage and objected to it, the filmmakers decided to destroy the reel permanently, since it had not received Stalin's explicit approval.

The picture was released in December 1938, and became a great success with audiences: on 15 April 1939, Semen Dukelsky – the chairman of the State Committee for Cinematography – reported that it had already been viewed by 23,000,000 people and was the most popular of the films made in recent times.

After 23 August 1939, when the USSR signed the Molotov–Ribbentrop Pact, which provided for non-aggression and collusion between Germany and the Soviet Union, Alexander Nevsky was removed from circulation. However, the situation reversed dramatically on 22 June 1941 after the Axis invasion of the Soviet Union, and the film rapidly returned to Soviet and western screens.

Style
Alexander Nevsky is less experimental in its narrative structure than Eisenstein's previous films; it tells one story with a single narrative arc and focuses on one main character. The special effects and cinematography were some of the most advanced at the time.

The film climaxes in the half-hour Battle of the Ice, propelled by Prokofiev's ominous, rousing, triumphant musical narrative, a sequence that has served as a model for epic movie battles ever since (e.g., Henry V, Spartacus, The Empire Strikes Back). This climactic set piece was the first to be filmed and, since it was shot during a blazing hot summer on a location outside Moscow, cinematographer Eduard Tisse had to take extraordinary steps to render a wintry landscape, including: use of a filter to suggest winter light, painting all the trees light blue and dusting them with chalk, creating an artificial horizon out of sand, and constructing simulated ice sheets out of asphalt and melted glass, supported by floating pontoons that were deflated on cue so that the ersatz ice sheets would shatter under the weight of the Teutonic knights according to pre-cut patterns.

Musical score

The film was the first of Eisenstein's dramatic films to use sound. (The earlier Bezhin Meadow had also used sound, but production was shut down and most of the finished scenes were destroyed.) The film's score was composed by Sergei Prokofiev, who later reworked the score into a concert cantata. The creation of Alexander Nevsky was a collaboration in the fullest sense of the word: some of the film was shot to Prokofiev's music and some of Prokofiev's music was composed to Eisenstein's footage. Prokofiev viewed the film's rough cut as the first step in composing its inimitable score. The strong and technically innovative collaboration between Eisenstein and Prokofiev in the editing process resulted in a match of music and imagery that remains a standard for filmmakers.  Valery Gergiev, the principal conductor of the London Symphony Orchestra, has stated his opinion that Prokofiev's music for this film is "the best ever composed for the cinema".

Film and concerts
In the 1990s a new, cleaner print became available. A number of symphony orchestras gave performances of Prokofiev's cantata, synchronized with a showing of the new print. The New York Philharmonic, the Detroit Symphony Orchestra, the San Francisco Symphony, the Philadelphia Orchestra, and the Baltimore Symphony Orchestra are five such ensembles. The concerts were quite popular, because Prokofiev's music is badly degraded by the original soundtrack recording, which suffers from extreme distortion and limited frequency response, as well as cuts to the original score to fit scenes that had already been shot. The cantata not only restored cuts but considerably expanded parts of the score.

New editions of the film
In 1986, the film was restored. The film was cleared, the film studio logo was added, the captions were replaced (only the font, but not the content), the music was re-recorded by Emin Khatchatourian conducting the State Symphony Cinema Orchestra.

In 1995, a new edition of the film was issued on VHS and laserdisc, for which Prokofiev's score was entirely re-recorded in hi-fi digital stereo by Yuri Temirkanov conducting the St. Petersburg Philharmonic Orchestra and Chorus, although the dialogue portions of the soundtrack were left unchanged. This enabled a new generation to experience Eisenstein's film and Prokofiev's score in high fidelity, rather than having to settle for the badly recorded musical portion that had existed since the film's original release. There is no version of the re-recorded score available on DVD.

In popular culture
Multiple works have been influenced by or refer to Alexander Nevsky.

Films
 Scenes from the film were later incorporated into the American propaganda film The Battle of Russia (1943)
 Love and Death (1975), written and directed by Woody Allen, parodies Russian film and literature. The film used the Alexander Nevsky score.
 Wizards (1977) uses stock footage from the film in its battle sequences, which were animated using rotoscoping.
 Certain scenes in John Milius's fantasy epic Conan the Barbarian (1982) were influenced by Alexander Nevsky. The introduction of Thulsa Doom and his henchmen after the destruction of Conan's village is reminiscent of the depiction of the Grand Master of the Teutonic Knights and his fellow knights after the conquest of Pskov. With its score and choreography, the final ride and attack of the Riders of Doom against Conan resembles the Teutonic Order's cavalry approaching Nevsky in the Battle of Lake Peipus; also, the Enigma of Steel, a major theme of the Conan film, is already mentioned by Nevsky during the final Battle of the Ice.
 In Red Dawn (1984), the marquee at the movie theater in occupied America is showing the film. Red Dawn itself, in some ways, is a variation on the theme of insurgency and rebellion in Alexander Nevsky.
 Several additional films have scenes strongly influenced by the depiction of the Battle on the Ice, including:
 Doctor Zhivago (1965)
  Chimes at Midnight (1965)
 Billion Dollar Brain (1967)
 The Empire Strikes Back (1980)
 Mulan (1998)
 King Arthur (2004)

Literature
 Tom Clancy's novel Red Storm Rising (1986) depicts two American intelligence officers watching Alexander Nevsky (on an unauthorized Soviet state television satellite feed) on the eve of World War III. The officers take note of an improved sound track, as well as the anti-German sentiment and strong sense of Russian (as opposed to Soviet) nationalism.  The next day, as part of a plot to split the NATO alliance politically, KGB agents detonate a bomb in the Kremlin, killing a group of children from Pskov, and later arrest a West German sleeper agent on charges of terrorism.
 Nevsky: Hero of the People (2012), a graphic novel adaptation of the film, was written by Ben McCool, with art by Mario Guevara and published by IDW Publishing.

See also
 Ilya Muromets (film)

References

External links
 Alexander Nevsky(Full HD) YouTube Киноконцерн "Мосфильм" channel

 
 
 
Alexander Nevsky an essay by J. Hoberman at the Criterion Collection
 Alexander Nevsky at official Mosfilm site with English subtitles

1938 films
1930s historical drama films
1930s biographical drama films
Soviet historical drama films
Soviet war drama films
Soviet biographical drama films
Soviet epic films
Soviet black-and-white films
Russian biographical drama films
Northern Crusades films
War epic films
War films based on actual events
Films set in Russia
Films set in the 13th century
Mosfilm films
Films directed by Sergei Eisenstein
Films directed by Dmitri Vasilyev
Films scored by Sergei Prokofiev
Alexander Nevsky
Articles containing video clips
Russian war drama films
Censored films
1938 drama films
Russian black-and-white films
Russian historical drama films
1930s Russian-language films